Lexington is a town in Lauderdale County, Alabama, United States. It is part of the Florence - Muscle Shoals Metropolitan Statistical Area known as "The Shoals". It incorporated in 1959. As of the 2010 census, the population of the town is 735, down from 840 in 2000. The current mayor of Lexington is Sandra Killen-Burroughs.

Geography
Lexington is located at  (34.966115, -87.372892).

Major highways
 State Route 101
 State Route 64

Climate

Demographics

2020 census

As of the 2020 United States census, there were 727 people, 366 households, and 261 families residing in the town.

2000 census
As of the census of 2000, there were 840 people, 364 households, and 244 families residing in the town. The racial makeup of the town was 99.29% White, 0.24% Native American, and 0.48% from two or more races. 0.36% of the population were Hispanic or Latino of any race.

There were 364 households, out of which 27.5% had children under the age of 18 living with them, 55.2% were married couples living together, 8.2% had a female householder with no husband present, and 32.7% were non-families. 30.5% of all households were made up of individuals, and 18.1% had someone living alone who was 65 years of age or older. The average household size was 2.31 and the average family size was 2.86.

In the town, the population was spread out, with 21.8% under the age of 18, 7.6% from 18 to 24, 27.9% from 25 to 44, 23.8% from 45 to 64, and 18.9% who were 65 years of age or older. The median age was 40 years. For every 100 females, there were 85.0 males. For every 100 females age 18 and over, there were 87.7 males.

The median income for a household in the town was $31,736, and the median income for a family was $38,500. Males had a median income of $35,083 versus $17,422 for females. The per capita income for the town was $15,184. About 5.9% of families and 9.8% of the population were below the poverty line, including 5.5% of those under age 18 and 18.7% of those age 65 or over.

Notable people
 Frank Nunley, former linebacker for the San Francisco 49ers
 Don Leslie Michael, posthumous Medal of Honor recipient for his actions in the Vietnam War; buried at Mount Pleasant Baptist Church.

References

External links

Towns in Lauderdale County, Alabama
Florence–Muscle Shoals metropolitan area
Towns in Alabama